Ritam Chowdhury is an Indian writer, physician, epidemiologist and biostatistician scientist of Bengali descent. His work in the fields of applied epidemiology, health economics, and outcomes research has contributed towards evidence-based medicine guidelines for oncology, heart disease, diabetes and trauma care. He is the Research Director of Medical Associates for Research and Communication (MARC). He also holds appointments as Visiting Instructor of Epidemiology and Biostatistics at the Global Health Department of Rollins School of Public Health, Atlanta and Statistical Consultant for the Instructional Computing Facility at Harvard School of Public Health (HSPH), Boston.

Early life 
Chowdhury was born into a Bengali family originally from Kolkata, India. He was born in New Delhi and later moved to Kolkata. In 1993, a few months after the infamous Bombay riots, his family moved to Bombay.

Education
Chowdhury is an alumnus of St. Mary's School (ISC, 1997–1999), Mazagaon, Mumbai and D. G. Ruparel College of Arts, Science & Commerce (HSC, 1999–2001), Matunga, Mumbai. He graduated with a MBBS degree from Lokmanya Tilak Municipal Medical College, Sion, Mumbai at the Maharashtra University of Health Sciences, Nasik in 2005. He worked at Kalyan District Prison, Thane district thereafter as Medical Officer. He was awarded an MPH in Epidemiology from Johns Hopkins Bloomberg School of Public Health, Baltimore, Maryland in 2009, PhD in Epidemiology in 2013 from Emory University, Atlanta and SM in Biostatistics from Harvard School of Public Health in 2015.

Awards and honors

Chowdhury has received multiple awards in his relatively short career.
 1999 – Ebrahim M. Rowjee Scholarship 
 1999 – Board Topper Mathematics –  Indian Certificate of Secondary Education (ICSE) 
 2001 – Placed on the Maharashtra State Higher Secondary Certificate Board Examinations Merit List
 2002 – Distinction in Anatomy
 2002 – Distinction in Biochemistry
 2002 – Distinction in Physiology
 2002 – 2003 Sir Ratan Tata Scholarship
 2003 – Distinction in Microbiology
 2003 – Distinction in Pathology
 2003–2005 JRD Tata Scholarship
 2008 – 2009 Sir Ratan Tata Scholarship 
 2008 – 2009 J. N. Tata Scholarship
 2009 – inducted into the Delta Omega Society, Alpha Chapter at Johns Hopkins Bloomberg School of Public Health
 2020 - COVID19 Survivor

Scientific publications 

Full list of publications.

Selected papers

Literary work and hobbies
Chowdhury has also published 14 books under the pseudonym Thomas R. M. Webbe, crediting Chowdhury as the editor. His stories, based in British India, notably feature the exploits of Rito and Gaja. This detective series has been very popular in India among children. In addition, he has written in other genres of fiction for children.

Chowdhury recently made his poetry blog, Catharsis, public. He writes poetry under the pseudonym Ri Tam, three volumes of which have been published.

Chowdhury is a polyglot and speaks 10 languages apart from English.

See also
List of Indian writers
List of Indian poets

References 

1983 births
20th-century English poets
20th-century Indian medical doctors
20th-century Indian poets
20th-century Indian male writers
21st-century Indian poets
21st-century Indian male writers
Bengali writers
Emory University faculty
English-language poets from India
Harvard Medical School faculty
Harvard School of Public Health alumni
Biostatisticians
Indian epidemiologists
Indian male novelists
Indian public health doctors
Johns Hopkins Bloomberg School of Public Health alumni
Living people
Rollins School of Public Health alumni
St. Mary's School, Mumbai alumni
Writers from Mumbai